Jack Michael Wood (born 4 November 1994) is an English former first-class cricketer.

Wood was born at Reading in November 1994. He later studied at Durham University, where he made four appearances in first-class cricket for Durham MCCU, playing twice in 2015 against Somerset and Durham and twice in 2016 against Gloucestershire and Durham. Playing as a right-arm medium pace bowler, he took 3 wickets in his four matches at an average of 78.33, with best figures of 2 for 32.

References

External links

1994 births
Living people
sportspeople from Reading, Berkshire
Alumni of Durham University
English cricketers
Durham MCCU cricketers